Sandra Adolfsson (born 13 June 1987) is a Swedish footballer who plays for Vittsjö GIK in the Damallsvenskan.

References

External links 
 

1987 births
Living people
Swedish women's footballers
Sweden women's international footballers
Vittsjö GIK players
Damallsvenskan players
Women's association football midfielders
LGBT association football players
Lesbian sportswomen
Swedish LGBT sportspeople
Footballers from Malmö